The following is a list of broadcasts aired on what has at various times been identified by a combination of the following: RTÉ/Network 2 (Two).

Current broadcasts
Home-produced
  Dancing with the Stars (2017–present)
  It's a Park's Life
  Living the Wildlife
  Natural World
  News Feed (2014–present)
  Pet Island
  Republic of Telly (2009–present)
  The Sunday Game (1979–present)
  Two Tube (2009–present)

Australia & New Zealand

  Home and Away (1988–present)
  Neighbours (1985–2022)
  Wild New Zealand

USA
  90210 (2008–2013)
  Agent Carter (2015–present)
  Agents of S.H.I.E.L.D. (2013–present)
  The Americans (2013–present)
  The Big Bang Theory
  The Big C (2010–2013)
  Chicago P.D.
  Cougar Town (2010–2015)
  CSI (2000–2015)
  CSI Cyber (2015–present)
  Entourage (2005–2012)
  The Goldbergs (2013–present)
  Gotham
  Grey's Anatomy (2005–present)
  Homeland (2011–present)
  How to Get Away with Murder
  Masters of Sex (2013–present)
  NCIS: New Orleans
  New Girl (2013–present)
  Once Upon a Time
  Reign (2013–present)
  Resurrection (2014–2015)
  The Simpsons (1997–present)
  Suburgatory (2011–present)
  The Walking Dead (2010–present)

Canada
  The Next Steps

UK
  Alan Carr: Chatty Man
  Amazing Hotels
  Deadly 60
  The Dog Rescuers
  Don't Tell the Bride
  Emmerdale
  Father Ted (1995–present)
  Fawlty Towers
  The General
  Live at the Apollo
  Mr. Bean: The Animated Series
  Top Gear
  World's Busiest Cities

Young children's programming
  64 Zoo Lane
  Abadas
  AbraKIDabra!
  Agents of S.H.I.E.L.D.
  Angelina Ballerina: The Next Steps
  The Animals of Farthing Wood (1993–present)
  Animaniacs (1994–present)
   Arthur
  Balamory
  Bananas in Pyjamas (CGI series)
  Best Bugs Forever
  Ben and Holly's Little Kingdom
  Bing
  Bluey
  Bob the Builder (2015 series)
  Bob the Builder: Project Build It
  Boj
  Brain Freeze
  Brewster the Rooster
  Charlie and Lola
  Chuggington
  The Clangers (2015 series)
   Corneil and Bernie
  Critters.TV
  Danger Mouse (2015 series)
  Dawn of the Croods
  The Day Henry Met
  The Deep
  Dig in Diner (2015–present)
  Dorg Van Dango
  Dream Street
  Drop Dead Weird
      Enchantimals: Tales From Everwilde
  Everything's Rosie
  Fifi and the Flowertots
  Fireman Sam
  Fluffy Gardens (2006–2016)
  Gabby's Dollhouse
  Gigglebiz
  Go Jetters
  Hey Duggee
   Holly Hobbie 
  Horrible Histories (2015 series)
   Hotel Transylvania: The Series
  iCarly
  In the Night Garden...
  Inis Spraoi
  Jumanji
   Kate & Mim-Mim
  K-ON!
   Kody Kapow
  Kiva Can Do
  The Large Family
  Lifeboat Luke
  Lily's Driftwood Bay
  Little Roy
  The Looney Tunes Show
  The Loud House
  Magical Sites
  The Marvelous Misadventures of Flapjack
    Matt Hatter Chronicles
   Me Too!
  Millie Inbetween
   Mike the Knight
  Molang
  Mr Bloom's Nursery
  Mr. Mender and the Chummyjiggers
  My Pet and Me
  Nelly and Nora
  Nina and the Neurons
  Noddy in Toyland
   Noddy, Toyland Detective
  The Numtums
   The Octonauts
  Old Jack's Boat
  Our Seaside
   Pablo (2017–present)
  PAW Patrol
  Peppa Pig
  Pikwik Pack
  Pinky and the Brain (1996–present)
  Pip Ahoy!
  Poppy Cat
  Postman Pat (2003 series)
   Prank Patrol Down Under
  Puffin Rock (2015–present)
  Punky
  Rocketeers
  Sam & Cat
  Sarah & Duck
  Scooby-Doo! Mystery Incorporated
  Shaggy & Scooby-Doo Get a Clue!
  Shaun the Sheep
  Show Me, Show Me
  Spot Bots
  Storytime
  Strange Hill High
  Sullivan Sails (September 2021–present)
  Swashbuckle
  The Sylvester & Tweety Mysteries
  Taz-Mania
  Teen Titans Go!
  Thomas and Friends
   Thunderbirds Are Go
   Tilly and Friends
  Tom and Jerry Kids
  The Tom and Jerry Show
  Tree Fu Tom
  Trust Me I'm a Genie
  Turbo FAST
  Victorious
  Wallace & Gromit
  What Makes My Day
  What's New Scooby-Doo?
   Wild Kratts
  Wildernuts
  Wildwoods
  WooHOO Splash!
  Woolly and Tig
  Yu-Gi-Oh!: GX: Rise of the Sacred Beasts
   Zig and Zag

Nordic region
  1864 (2014)
  The Saboteurs: The Heavy Water War (2014)

Historic home-produced television programmes

0–9
2Phat
2TV

A
Against the Head
Anonymous
Après Match
Auld Ones

B
Bachelors Walk
Bazil's Culture Clash
The Beatbox
Black Box
Blackboard Jungle
The Blizzard of Oz
Bosco

C

The Cassidys

D
The Daisy Shoe
Dan & Becs
Deep Fried Swamp
Dempsey's Den/The Den/Den TV/Den 2
The Disney Club
Do the Right Thing
Don's Slot
Don't Feed the Gondolas
Dream Teams
Dummy Run
Dustin's Daily News

E
Echo Island
Ed Byrne's Just For Laughs/Neil Delamere's Just For Laughs
The End
The Ex-Files

F
Fade Street
The Fame Game
Father Ted
Fergus's Wedding
FISH
The Floradora Folk
Finbar's Class

G
Good Grief Moncrieff!
Gridlock
Green TV

I
Island Wildlife

J
Jo Maxi
Jump Around

K

Katherine Lynch

L

The Last Furlong
Later on 2
Leave It to Mrs. O'Brien
Legend
Livin' with Lucy
The Lucy Kennedy Show

M
Makin' Jake
Marketplace
Meet Your Neighbours
Mission Beach USA
The Modest Adventures of David O'Doherty
Monday Night Soccer
The Morbegs
The Movie Show
MT-USA
Murphy's America
Murphy's Australia

N

Naked Camera
Neddy
Network News
News 2
news2day
Newsnight
Nighthawks
No Disco

O
The Once a Week Show
Other Voices
Our House

P
Pajo and the Salty Frog
Pajo and the Salty Frog in Space
Pajo's Junkbox
The Panel
Paths to Freedom
Plastic Orange
Play the Game
The Podge and Rodge Show
Popscene
The Premiership/Premier Soccer Saturday
Prosperity
Pure Mule

Q

R
Raw
The Remini Riddle
Republic of Telly
Return of the Swamp Thing
RTÉ News on Two

S
The Saturday Club
A Scare at Bedtime
The Selection Box
Soupy Norman
The Sports Files
Stew
The Sunday Game
The Swamp
The Swamp Shop
The Swamp Summer Salad

T
This Is Nightlive
TX

U
The Unbelievable Truth

V
The View

W
Wanderlust

X

X-it File
X-it Poll

Z

Imported programming

Current
Emmerdale
Grey's Anatomy
Home and Away
Orange
Locodol
Parenthood
The Simpsons

Historic
16 Days of Glory
100 Great Paintings
240-Robert
3rd Rock from the Sun
The 5 Mrs. Buchanans
9 to 5
'Allo 'Allo!
The A-Team
The Abbott and Costello Show
Absolutely Fabulous
The Adventures of Brisco County, Jr.
The Adventures of Lano and Woodley
The Adventures of Swiss Family Robinson
The Adventures of the Black Stallion
African Skies
After the War
Agatha Christie's Poirot
Airline (1982 series)
Airwolf
Alexei Sayle's Stuff
Alfred Hitchcock Presents
ALF
Alias
All Creatures Great and Small
Ally McBeal
Ally
Amazon
American Dreamer
The Americans
An Exceptional Child
...And Mother Makes Three
Apple's Way
Are You Being Served?
Armchair Thriller
After Henry
Arthur C. Clarke's Mysterious World
Arthur C. Clarke's World of Strange Powers
Austin Stories
And Mother Makes Five
The Avengers
The Barchester Chronicles
Barnaby Jones
Barney Miller
Bangkok Hilton
Battlestar Galactica
Baywatch
The Beatles Anthology
Becker
Beggars and Choosers
The Benny Hill Show
Benson
Bergerac
Best Sellers
Bewitched
The Beverly Hillbillies
Beverly Hills, 90210
Beyond 2000
The Big Easy
The Big Match
Big Shamus, Little Shamus
The Bill
Biography
The Bionic Woman
Blackadder Goes Forth
Black Books
Black Forest Clinic
Blake's 7
Blankety Blank
Blind Justice
Blue Heelers
Blue Thunder
Bonanza
Boogies Diner
Bookmark
Boston Common
Boston Public
Boys from the Blackstuff
The Brady Bunch
Brass
The Bretts
Brideshead Revisited
Brimstone
The Bronx Zoo
Brooklyn Bridge
Buck Rogers in the 25th Century
Bugs
Cabbages and Kings (Game show)
California Dreams
Call My Bluff
Callan
The Campbells
Campus Cops
Cannon and Ball
The Cape
Capital News
Captains and the Kings
Car 54, Where Are You?
Cardiac Arrest
Caroline in the City
Carry On Laughing
The Castaways
Celebrity Squares
Central Park West
Charlie's Angels
Check It Out!
Cheers
A Child's Christmas in Wales
China Beach
Christy
The Cisco Kid
The Civil War
Clueless
Coach
Code Red
The Colbys
Colditz
Columbo
The Commish
Coronation Street
Consuming Passions
The Cosby Show
A Country Practice
Covington Cross
The Cowra Breakout
Crazy Like a Fox
The Critic
Crossbow
The Crow: Stairway to Heaven
Crusades
Cybill
Danger Bay
Dark Angel
Dawson's Creek
The Days and Nights of Molly Dodd
Deadly Games
Death Valley Days
Dempsey and Makepeace
Desperate Housewives
Dharma and Greg
Diagnosis: Murder
Diamonds
Dickens of London
The Dick Cavett Show
The Dick Emery Show

Diff'rent Strokes
Dinosaurs
The District
Doc Elliot
The Donny and Marie Show
Doogie Howser, M.D.
Drama with Anna
Dr. Quinn, Medicine Woman
Due South
Durrell in Russia
Dweebs
Dynasty (1981 series)
Earth: Final Conflict
Ed
The Eddie Capra Mysteries
Edward and Mrs. Simpson
Eerie, Indiana
Ellen
Empty Nest
Entourage
ER
The Event
Executive Stress
Explore
Extra
Ever Decreasing Circles
Every Window Tells a Story
Everybody Loves Raymond
E.N.G.
Falcon Crest
The Fall and Rise of Reginald Perrin
The Fall Guy
Fame
Fame L.A.
Family Matters
Family Ties
Father of the Pride
Felicity
Ferris Bueller
A Fine Romance
First Time Out
Flambards
A Flame to the Phoenix
Flash Gordon Conquers the Universe
FlashForward
Flight into Hell
The Flintstones
Flipper (1964 series)
The Flying Doctors
Fortunes of War
Foul-Ups, Bleeps & Blunders
The Foundation
Frasier
Frankenstein's Aunt
Frank's Place
The Fresh Prince of Bel-Air
The Fugitive
Game On
Game, Set and Match
The Generation Game
Get Smart
Globe Trekker
Gloria
God, the Devil and Bob
The Golden Girls
Golden Soak
Golden Years
Goodbye, Mr Kent
Grace Under Fire
Great Little Railways
The Great Moghuls
The Gregory Hines Show
The Grimleys
Grounded for Life
Guitar with Frederick Noad
Gun
Halifax f.p.
Hamish Macbeth
Hang Time
Happy Days
Hardcastle and McCormick
The Hardy Boys
Harry and the Hendersons
Harry O
Hart to Hart
Hawkeye
Head of the Class
Heimat: A Chronicle of Germany
Heartbreak High
The Henderson Kids
Here's Lucy
Higher Ground
Hill Street Blues
Hippies
Home Improvement
A Home in the Green Land
Home to Roost
Homicide: Life on the Street
The Hong Kong Beat
House of Cards
How We Learned to Ski
Hoyt 'n Andy's Sportsbender
I Dream of Jeannie
I, Claudius
In Loving Memory
In the Heat of the Night
Inspector Morse
The Invisible Man (1975 series)
Island Son
It's Like, You Know...
The Jackie Gleason Show
Jake and the Fatman
Jeeves and Wooster
Jesse
The Jewel in the Crown
Jim'll Fix It
Joey
Kate and Allie
Katts and Dog
King of the Hill
King Lear (1982 series)
The Knock
Knots Landing
Knight Rider (1982 series)
Kojak
Kung Fu
Land of the Giants
The Larry Sanders Show
The Last Days of Pompeii
The Late, Late Breakfast Show
Laurel and Hardy
Laurence Olivier Presents
Law and Order
The League of Gentlemen
Legendary Trails
Life Goes On
Life on Earth
Lillie
The Living Planet
Lois & Clark: The New Adventures of Superman
Longstreet
Lou Grant
Love & War
Lost
The Lotus Eaters
Love in a Cold Climate
The Lucie Arnaz Show
Lytton's Diary
MacGyver
Major Dad
Malibu Shores
Manimal
Manions of America
The Man from U.N.C.L.E.
Marlin Bay
Married... with Children
The Mary Tyler Moore Show
Mastermind
May to December
McKenna
Melrose Place (1992 series)
Men Behaving Badly
Messengers from Moscow
Mickey Spillane's Mike Hammer (1984 series)
Millennium
Minder
The Mind of Mr. J.G. Reeder
Mind Your Language
Misfits of Science
Mistral's Daughter
Mitch
Moesha
Mom P.I.
The Monkees
Monster: A Portrait of Stalin in Blood
Monty Python's Flying Circus
Moonlighting
Mork and Mindy
Movie Magic
Mr. Belvedere
Mr. Merlin
Mr. President
Mr Smith's Favourite Garden
The Munsters Today
The Muppet Show
Muppets Tonight
Murder Call
Murder, She Wrote
Murphy Brown
Music at Harewood
My Favorite Martian
My So-Called Life
Mysteries of the Sea
M*A*S*H
Nancy Astor
The Nanny
Nanny
The Nature of Things
Nature's Kingdom
Nash Bridges
Nashville Swing
Neon Rider
Never the Twain
Newhart
The New Adventures of Robin Hood
New York Undercover
No Job for a Lady
The Norman Conquests
Northern Exposure
Nowhere Man
The Nutt House
NYPD Blue
The Odd Couple (1970 series)
Oh Madeline
Oh No, It's Selwyn Froggitt!
Old House, New House
One Foot in the Grave
One Man and His Dog
One More Time!
Only Fools and Horses
Only When I Laugh
Operavox: The Animated Operas
The Optimist
The Osbournes
Our Gang
Our Hero
The Outer Limits
Palmerstown, U.S.A.
Pan Am
The Paper Chase
Paradise Postponed
The Parkers
Party of Five
Peer Gynt and His Mother
The People's Court
Perfect Strangers
Persuasion (1971 series)
The Petrov Affair
Peyton Place
Planet Earth
Pole to Pole
Poor Little Rich Girl: The Barbara Hutton Story
Popular
Porridge
Praying Mantis
Prime Suspect
Prison Break
Private Practice
Private Schulz
Project Z
Quincy, M.E.
Rapido
Reasonable Doubts
Red Dwarf
The Return of Sherlock Holmes
Return of the Saint
Return to Treasure Island
Rhoda
Riding High
Ripley's Believe It or Not! (1949 series)
Rising Damp
The Rivals of Sherlock Holmes
The Road to War
The Rockford Files
Roots: The Next Generations
Roseanne
Rowan & Martin's Laugh-In
The Royle Family
Rumpole of the Bailey
Ryan's Hope
Sabrina the Teenage Witch
Saved by the Bell
Scarecrow and Mrs. King
Scotland's Story
Screen Two
Scrubs
SeaQuest DSV
Secret Army
The Secret Life of Us
Secret Nature
Seinfeld
Selling Hitler
Shakespeare: The Animated Tales
Sha Na Na
Shillingbury Tales
Sidekicks
Silver Spoons
Sister, Sister
Sledge Hammer!
Sliders
Slinger's Day
Smallville
The Smith Family
Something Wilder
The Sopranos
Spaced
Spaceflight
Space Precinct
Special Squad
Spenser: For Hire
Spies
Spin City
Spitting Image
Square Deal
Stargate SG-1
Starman
Star Runner
Star Trek
Star Trek: Deep Space Nine
Star Trek: The Next Generation
The Stationary Ark
Stay Lucky
The Story of Fashion
The Storyteller
Strangers and Brothers
Street Legal (1987 series)
The Streets of San Francisco
St. Elsewhere
Suddenly Susan
The Sullivans
The Sun Also Rises (1984 film)
Surgical Spirit
Survival
$weepstake$
Sweet Valley High
Swim
The Sword of Islam
Sykes
Taggart
Tales from the Dark Side
Tales of the Unexpected
Taxi
Telford's Change
Tenko
That '70s Show
That's Hollywood
That's My Boy (1981 series)
Third Watch
Thirtysomething
This Is Your Life (UK version)
This Life
The Three Stooges
Tide of Life
The Timeless Land
Tinsel Town
Tom Grattan's War
Tomorrow's World
Top of the Hill
Top of the Pops
The Tracey Ullman Show
Trapper John, M.D.
The Travelin' Gourmet
Treasure Island in Outer Space
The Trials of Life
Tripper's Day
The Twilight Zone (1985 series)
Twin Peaks
Two of a Kind
Two's Company
UC: Undercover
Unforgettable (1981 series)
United States of Tara
The Unknown War
Unsub
Up the Garden Path
Upstairs, Downstairs (1971 series)
Veronica's Closet
Vietnam: The Ten Thousand Day War
The Virginian
Wait Till Your Father Gets Home
Walking with Beasts
Wanted Dead or Alive
War and Remembrance
Water Rats
Wayne and Shuster
We Got It Made
When the Boat Comes In
Where the Sky Begins
White Fang
Who Pays the Ferryman?
Who's the Boss?
Wild, Wild World of Animals
Wilde Alliance
Wings
Wiseguy
WKRP in Cincinnati
Wogan
The Wonder Years
World in Action
The X-Files
Xena: Warrior Princess
A Year in the Life
Young at Heart
Young Lions
The Young Indiana Jones Chronicles
The Young Ones
The Young Person's Guide to Becoming a Rock Star
Zorro (1990 series)

Young children's programming
The 13 Ghosts of Scooby-Doo
2 Stupid Dogs
24Seven
3-2-1 Contact
Ace Ventura: Pet Detective
Action League Now!
Action Man (1995 series)
Action Man (2000 series)
The Addams Family (1973 series)
The Addams Family (1992 series)
The Adventure Series
The Adventures of Blinky Bill
The Adventures of Bottle Top Bill and His Best Friend Corky
The Adventures of a Mouse
The Adventures of Dawdle the Donkey
The Adventures of Hyperman
The Adventures of Jimmy Neutron: Boy Genius
The Adventures of Mole
The Adventures of Paddington Bear
The Adventures of Pete and Pete
The Adventures of Raggedy Ann and Andy
The Adventures of Rocky and Bullwinkle
The Adventures of Rupert Bear
The Adventures of Sam
The Adventures of Scrapiron O'Toole
The Adventures of Skippy
Adventures of Sonic the Hedgehog
The Adventures of Super Mario Bros. 3
The Adventures of Teddy Ruxpin
The Adventures of Tintin
Adventures on Kythera
Against the Odds
Agent Z and the Penguin from Mars
Aladdin
Albie
Alias the Jester
Alien's First Christmas
Ali and the Camel
Alligator Pie
All Change
All Dogs Go to Heaven: The Series
All Grown Up!
All for One
The All-New Pink Panther Show
The All-New Popeye Show
Alvin and the Chipmunks
The Amazing Adrenalini Brothers
Amigo and Friends
Andrew's Ark
Andy Pandy
Angelina Ballerina
The Angry Beavers
Animal Alphabet
Animal Ark
Animal Park
Animal Spies!
The Animal Shelf
Animated Hero Classics
Animated Tales of the World
Animorphs
Anthony Ant
Aquila
Are You Afraid of the Dark?
ARK, the Adventures of Animal Rescue Kids
Around the World in 80 Days
Around the World with Willy Fog
As Told by Ginger
Astro Boy (2003 series)
Atomic Betty
Atom Ant
The Avengers: United They Stand
A.J.'s Time Travelers
The Babaloos
Babar
Babar and Father Christmas
Baby Bollies
Back to the Future
Bananas in Pyjamas (Original series)
Barriers
Barney & Friends
The Basil Brush Show
Batman Beyond
Batman: The Animated Series
Bay City
Bear in the Big Blue House
The Bear's Island
The Bears Who Saved Christmas
Beethoven
Beetlejuice
The Berenstain Bears
Bernard's Watch
The Bellflower Bunnies
Beyblade
Beyond the Break
The BFG
Big Cook, Little Cook
Big Guy and Rusty the Boy Robot
Big Kids
Biker Mice from Mars (1993 series)
Biker Mice from Mars (2006 series)
Bill and Ben
Bimble's Bucket
Binka
The Biskitts
The Biz
Black Beauty
The Blobs
Blue Peter Special Assignment
Blue Water High
Bluetoes the Christmas Elf
Bob Morane
Bob the Builder (Original series)
Bobobobs
Bonkers
Boo!
Boo to You Too! Winnie the Pooh
Boohbah
Bouli
The Box of Delights
The Boy from Andromeda
The Boy with Two Heads
Braceface
Brambly Hedge
Brand Spankin' New! Doug
BraveStarr
Breaker High
Breakpoint
Brendon Chase
Bright Sparks
The Brollys
Broomstick Cottage
Brown Bear's Wedding
Brum
Bruno the Kid
Budgie the Little Helicopter
The Bugs Bunny Show
Bugs Bunny's Howl-oween Special
Bugs Bunny's Looney Christmas Tales
Bugs Bunny's Mad World of Television
Bugs Bunny's Wild World of Sports
Bugs vs. Daffy: Battle of the Music Video Stars
Bump
Bump in the Night
A Bunch of Munsch
Bunk'd
Bunnicula
Bushfire Moon
Busytown Mysteries
Butterfly Island
Brandy & Mr. Whiskers
Bratz
Brothers by Choice
Brown Bear's Wedding
Bruno the Kid
Bugtime Adventures
The Buzz on Maggie
Buzz Lightyear of Star Command
Byker Grove
C Bear and Jamal
Cadillacs and Dinosaurs
Caillou
The California Raisin Show
Captain Cook's Travels
Captain Fracasse
Captain Planet and the Planeteers
Captain Scarlet and the Mysterons
Captain Simian and the Space Monkeys
Captain Zed and the Zee Zone
Cardcaptors
The Care Bears
Casper and the Angels
Casper and Friends
Casper Classics
Casper the Friendly Ghost
Casper's First Christmas
The Castle of Adventure
CatDog
Catscratch
Catweazle
Cave Kids
CBS Schoolbreak Special
CBS Storybreak
ChalkZone
Charlie Chalk
Chick, Chick, Chick
The Chiffy Kids
Children of Fire Mountain
Children's Island
Children's Ward
The Chimpmates
Chip 'n Dale: Rescue Rangers
The Chipmunks Go to the Movies
Chocky
Christopher the Christmas Tree
Chris Cross
Christmas Everyday
The Christmas Star
A Christmas Story
The Christmas Toy
The Christmas Visitor
The Chronicles of Narnia
The Chimpmates
Chucklewood Critters
City Tails
Clarissa Explains It All
Classic Fairy Tales
Class of the Titans
Close Up
Clowning Around
Cockleshell Bay
Codename Icarus
Come Outside
A Connecticut Rabbit in King Arthur's Court
Construction Site
Cooking for Kids with Luis
Cool McCool
The Coral Island
Corneil and Bernie
Cornflakes for Tea
A Cosmic Christmas
Courage the Cowardly Dog
Count Duckula
The Country Mouse and the City Mouse Adventures
Cow and Chicken
The Crayon Box
Crayon Shin-Chan
Creepy Crawlers
Cro
Curious George
Cyborg 009
Daffy Duck in Hollywood
Darkwing Duck
Dastardly and Muttley in Their Flying Machines
David and the Gnomes
David and the Magic Pearl
Defenders of the Earth
The Demon Headmaster
Dennis the Menace and Gnasher
Degrassi Junior High
Detective Bogey
Detention
Dexter's Laboratory
Diabolik
Dig and Dug
Digimon
Dink, the Little Dinosaur
Dinky Dog
Dinky Winky Circus
Dinobabies
Dinozaurs
Dirty Beasts
Dirty Rat Tales
Disney's Adventures of the Gummi Bears
Disney's House of Mouse
Doctor Dolittle
Doctor Snuggles
Dog and Cat
Dog City
Dogtanian and the Three Muskehounds
Dogstar
Donald's Quack Attack
Don't Eat the Neighbours
The Doombolt Chase
Dot and Spot's Magical Christmas Adventure
The Dot and the Kangaroo Films
Doug
Dr. Seuss on the Loose
Dramarama
Dragon's Lair
The Dreamstone
Droopy
Droopy, Master Detective
DuckTales (Original series)
Earthwatch
Earthworm Jim
Ed, Edd 'n Eddy
Eddy and the Bear
The Edison Twins
Edward and Friends
Eerie, Indiana: The Other Dimension
Elephant Boy
The Elephant Show
Elmo Saves Christmas
Emlyn's Moon
Enchanted Tales
The Enid Blyton Adventure Series
Enid Blyton's Enchanted Lands
Enid Blyton's Secret Series
Erky Perky
Escape from Jupiter
Extreme Dinosaurs
Extreme Ghostbusters
The Fabulous Fleischer Folio
Faireez
The Fairly OddParents!
The Fairytaler
Family Dog
The Famous Five (1978 series)
The Famous Five (1995 series)
Fantaghirò
The Fantastic Adventures of the Ugly Duckling
Fantastic Four (1978 series)
The Fantastic Voyages of Sinbad the Sailor
Fantomcat
Father Christmas and the Missing Reindeer
Fennec
Fergus McPhail
Ferry Boat Fred
Fetch! with Ruff Ruffman
Fetch the Vet
Fiddley Foodle Bird
Fievel's American Tails
Fillmore!
Fimbles
Fireman Sam (Original series)
Fireman Sam: Snow Business
Five Children and It
The Flaxton Boys
Flight 29 Down
A Flintstone Christmas
A Flintstone Family Christmas
The Flintstone Kids
Foofur
For Better or For Worse (TV specials)
The Forgotten Toys
Fourways Farm
Foxbusters
Fox Tales
Fraidy Cat
Fraggle Rock
Fraggle Rock: The Animated Series
Franklin
Freakazoid
Free Willy
Frog and Toad are Friends
The Frog Show
Frosty Returns
Frosty the Snowman
The Fruitties
Fudge
The Funky Phantom
Funnybones
Funny Little Bugs
Gadget and the Gadgetinis
Gadget Boy and Heather
Garfield and Friends
Gargoyles
Garth and Bev
Gather Your Dreams
The Genie From Down Under
Gentle Ben
George and Martha
George of the Jungle (2007 series)
George Shrinks
Gerald McBoing-Boing
Get Ed
Ghostwriter
The Girl from Tomorrow
The Gingerbread Man
Gladiator Academy
The Gnoufs
Godzilla: The Animated Series
Goof Troop
Goosebumps
Gophers!
Gordon the Garden Gnome
Granpa
Gravity Falls
The Great Grape Ape
Grimm's Fairy Tales
Grizzly Tales for Gruesome Kids
Groove High
The Growing Summer
Grossology
Halfway Across the Galaxy and Turn Left
Hamilton the Musical Elephant
A Handful of Songs
Happily Ever After: Fairy Tales for Every Child
The Happy Castle
Happy Ness: Secret of the Loch
The Happy Prince
Harry and His Bucket Full of Dinosaurs
Harry and the Wrinklies
Harry's Mad
The Haunted School
He-Man and the Masters of the Universe (1983 series)
Heads and Tails
Henry's Cat
Henry's Leg
Henry's World
Here's How!
Hey Arnold!
Hi-5High FlyersHilltop HospitalHills EndHisteria!Hobberdy DickHokey WolfHorrid HenryThe Hot Rod Dogs and Cool Car CatsHotshotzHowHow Bugs Bunny Won the WestHoze HoundzHuckleberry HoundHuntingtowerHurricanesHypernautsI am WeaselIf You'd Believe ThisIggy ArbuckleIn the Wild with Harry ButlerThe Incredible DetectivesThe Incredible HulkInspector GadgetInspector MouseInto the LabyrinthInukIron Nose: The Mysterious KnightIt's a Big Big WorldIt's a Wonderful Tiny Toons Christmas SpecialIvanhoeIznogoudJackanory PlayhouseJackie Chan AdventuresJackson Pace: The Great YearsJacob Two-TwoJakers! The Adventures of Piggley WinksJames Bond Jr.Jason of Star CommandJennifer's JourneyThe JetsonsJim Button and Luke the Engine DriverJim Henson's Animal ShowJim Henson's Mother Goose StoriesJoe 90Joey and RedhawkJohann's Gift to ChristmasJohnny BravoJohnson and FriendsJonny QuestJosie SmithJoshua JonesThe Journey of Allen StrangeJourney to the Center of the EarthJungle BeatJungliesJuniper JungleJust So StoriesJust WilliamKaBlam!KaboodleKangaroo Creek GangKellyKenan and KelKetchup: Cats Who CookKid Clones from Outer SpaceKid PaddleKideoKidsongsThe Kids of Degrassi StreetThe Kids from Room 402Kim PossibleKipperKit and KaboodleK10C: Kids' Ten CommandmentsThe Land Before TimeLassie (1954 series)Lassie (1997 series)Laugh and Learn with Richard ScarryLavender CastleThe Legend of Prince ValiantThe Legend of White FangThe Legends of Treasure IslandLilly the WitchThe LionheartsLittle BearThe Little Engine That CouldThe Little Match GirlThe Little MermaidLittle MissLittle MonstersLittle Mouse on the PrairieA Little PrincessLittle Red TractorLittle RobotsLittle Sir NicholasThe Little Troll PrinceLittle WizardsLittle ZooThe Littlest HoboLittlest Pet ShopLizzie's LibraryLloyd in SpaceThe Long EnchantmentLook UpLooney TunesLoopy de LoopLos LuchadoresThe Lost WorldLRTVLunar JimL.A. 7MadballsMadelineMadeline in LondonMadeline's ChristmasMcGee and Me!Maggie and the Ferocious BeastThe Magical Adventures of QuasimodoThe MagicianThe Magic CrownMagic Adventures of MumfieThe Magic LibraryMagic MountainThe Magic PencilThe Magic School BusThe Magnificent Six and 1/2Make Way for NoddyMarsupilamiMartin MysteryMarvel Action HourMary-Kate and Ashley in Action!The Mask: Animated SeriesMasked RiderMathematical EyeMatilda's DreamMax and MoritzMax and RubyMax SteelMaya the BeeMedabotsMega ManMen in Black: The SeriesMental BlockMerlin the Magical PuppyMermaid Melody Pichi Pichi PitchMerrie MelodiesA Merry Mirthworm ChristmasMetalheadsMiami 7MicrosoapMiddle EnglishMighty DucksMighty MaxMighty Morphin Power RangersMighty Mouse: The New AdventuresMighty Mouse and FriendsMike and AngeloMike, Lu and OgMirror, MirrorMirror, Mirror IIMiss BGMission Top SecretMole's ChristmasMona the VampireMonchhichisMonster Buster ClubA Monster ChristmasMonster WarriorsMontyMoominMoonacreMoondialThe MoonkysThe Moon StallionMopatop's ShopMort & PhilMouse and MoleA Mouse, a Mystery and MeMowgli: The New Adventures of the Jungle BookThe Mozart BandMr. MagooMr MajeikaMr MenMr Men and Little MissMr. TMr WymiMumble BumbleMummies Alive!Mummy NannyMuppet BabiesMuzzy in GondolandThe Mysterious Cities of GoldThe Mystic Knights of Tir Na NOgMy Gym Partner's a MonkeyMy Little PrinceMy ZooM*U*S*HNASCAR RacersNaturally SadieNed's NewtThe Neverending StoryThe New Adventures of Flash GordonThe New Adventures of Captain PlanetThe New Adventures of MadelineThe New Adventures of Mother GooseThe New Adventures of Ocean GirlThe New Adventures of the Shoe PeopleThe New Adventures of Speed RacerThe New Adventures of Winnie the PoohThe New Adventures of Zorro (1981 series)The New Adventures of Zorro (1997 series)The New Batman AdventuresThe New LassieThe New Pink Panther ShowThe New Scooby-Doo MoviesThe New Scooby-Doo MysteriesThe New Fred and Barney ShowThe New Woody Woodpecker ShowThe New World of the GnomesThe New Worst WitchThe New Yogi Bear ShowNewton's AppleThe NightingaleNilus the SandmanNinja Turtles: The Next MutationNoah's IslandNobody's HouseNoddyNoddy's Toyland AdventuresNo SweatO Christmas TreeOakie DokeOcean GirlOceans Alive!The OdysseyOn Christmas EveOnce Upon a Time... LifeOnce Upon a Time... SpaceOnce Upon a Time... The AmericasOnce Upon a Time... The DiscoverersOnce Upon a Time... The ExplorersOrson and OliviaOscar and FriendsOscar's OrchestraOvide VideoThe Owl ServiceOWL/TVThe Oz KidsThe OzletsPalsPapa Beaver's StorytimePapyrusPaw PawsPB&J OtterPecolaPeep and the Big Wide WorldPelswickPepper AnnPercy the Park KeeperThe Perils of Penelope PitstopPeter Swift and the Little CircusPhantom 2040Phil of the FuturePhineas and FerbThe Phoenix and the Carpet (1997 series)PicmePig's BreakfastThe PilisThe Pillow People Save ChristmasPinguThe Pink Panther and FriendsPink Panther and SonsThe Pink Panther ShowPinky, Elmyra and the BrainPinocchio's ChristmasPip the Appleseed KnightPippi LongstockingPirate FamilyThe Pirates of Dark WaterPitfall!Pitt and KantropPixie and Dixie and Mr. JinksPlanet SketchPocket Dragon AdventuresPokémonThe Poky Little Puppy's First ChristmasPolka Dot ShortsPop PiratesPopeye and FriendsPopeye and SonPostman Pat (Original series)Postman Pat and the Toy SoldiersPostman Pat Takes the BusPotamus ParkPotsworth & CoPower Rangers Dino ThunderPower Rangers in SpacePower Rangers Lightspeed RescuePower Rangers Lost GalaxyPower Rangers Mystic ForcePower Rangers Time ForcePower Rangers Wild ForceThe Powerpuff GirlsPress GangPreston PigPrince of AtlantisThe Princess and the Flying ShoemakerPrincess SissiPuff the Magic DragonPuff the Magic Dragon in the Land of the Living LiesPugwallPugwall's SummerPunkin' Puss and MushmouseA Pup Named Scooby-DooThe Puppy's Further AdventuresP.J.'s Unfunnybunny ChristmasQuack PackThe Queen's NoseQuick Draw McGrawThe RaccoonsThe Raccoons on IceRadio Free RoscoeRamonaRargRat-a-Tat-TatThe Real Adventures of Jonny QuestThe Real GhostbustersThe Real Story of...ReBootRecessThe Red and the BlueRedbeard the PirateRedwallRenford RejectsRescue HeroesThe Return of DogtanianReturn of the AntelopeReturn to JupiterRic the RavenThe RiddlersRiver RivalsRoad RoversThe Road Runner ShowRoad to AvonleaRoboCop: Alpha CommandoRocket PowerRocky HollowRoger and the RottentrollsRolie Polie OlieThe Roly Mo ShowRomie-0 and Julie-8Romuald the ReindeerRoobarb and Custard TooRosie and JimRotten RalphRound the BendRound the TwistRuby & The RockitsRuby GloomRudolph and Frosty's Christmas in JulyRudolph the Red-Nosed ReindeerRugratsRunaway BayRupertS Club 7 Go Wild!Saban's Adventures of Oliver TwistSaber Rider and the Star SheriffsSabrina: The Animated SeriesSailor MoonSamson SuperslugSandokanSanta and the Tooth FairiesSanta Claus Is Comin' to TownSanta's First ChristmasSanto BugitoSara (1996 series)The Save-Ums!The Scientific EyeScooby-DooScooby and Scrappy-DooScooby, Scrappy and Yabba-DooScrooge Koala's ChristmasScruffSeabertThe Second Voyage of the MimiThe Secret Garden (TV series)The Secret Garden (1987 film)The Secret Lives of Waldo KittyThe Secret ShowThe Secret of the StoneSecret ValleyThe Secret World of Alex MackThe Secret World of Santa ClausSergeant StripesSesame StreetSesame Street Celebrates Around the WorldSesame Street Jam: A Musical CelebrationSharky and GeorgeSheeepSheep in the Big CityShe-Ra: Princess of PowerShining Time Station: 'Tis a GiftShinzoShip to ShoreShoebox ZooThe Shnookums and Meat Funny Cartoon ShowShuriken SchoolThe Silver BrumbySilver SurferSimba: The King LionSimon and the WitchSimsala GrimmSkippy: Adventures in BushtownSkippy the Bush KangarooSky TrackersSlimer! And the Real GhostbustersThe Small OneThe SmoggiesThe SmurfsSnailsbury TalesThe Sniffing BearSnifflesSnooper and BlabberSnorksThe Snow SpiderThe SnowmanSon of the SaharaSonic the HedgehogSonic XSpartakus and the Sun Beneath the SeaSpeed RacerSpellbinderSpellbinder: Land of the Dragon LordSpider-Man (1994 series)SplashSplash SpecialThe Spooktacular New Adventures of CasperSport BillySport Goofy in SoccermaniaSpotSpot's Magical ChristmasSpunky's First ChristmasSteel RidersStingray (1964 series)Storybook InternationalStorybook WorldThe Story of Santa ClausThe Story of Tracy BeakerThe Story StoreStrangersStreet SharksThe Suite Life of Zack & CodySuper Duper SumosThe Super Mario Bros. Super Show!Super Mario WorldSuperman (1988 series)Superman: The Animated SeriesSuperTedSwamp ThingSweatT-BagTake Me Up to the Ball GameThe Tales of Beatrix PotterTales from the Rubbish DumpTeddy Bear's AdventuresTeen TitansTeenage Mutant Hero Turtles (1987 series)Teenage Mutant Hero Turtles (2003 series)TeletubbiesTell Me a StoryThomas the Tank Engine and Friends (original series)The Three FishketeersThree Little TrampsThunderbirdsThunderbirds 2086ThunderstoneThe TickThe Timberwood TalesTimbuctooTime RidersTiny Toon AdventuresTitchToad PatrolThe TofusTom and JerryThe Tomorrow People (1992 series)ToonsylvaniaThe Toothbrush FamilyTop CatTots TVTottie: The Story of a Doll's HouseToucan TecsTouché Turtle and Dum DumThe Town That Santa ForgotTracey McBeanTractor TomTransformers: ArmadaTransformers: CybertronTransformers: EnergonTreasure in MaltaThe Treasure SeekersTricks of Brer RabbitThe TribeThe Trouble with 2BThe Trouble with SophieTruckersThe True Meaning of CrumbfestTrue TildaTugsTukiki and His Search for a Merry ChristmasTutensteinTweeniesThe Twisted Tales of Felix the Cat'Twas the Night Before Christmas (1974 special)UltraforceUlysses 31The Unbroken ArrowUnfabulousThe Untouchables of Elliot MouseA Valentine for YouValley of the DinosaursVictor and HugoThe Village by the SeaWacky and PackyWacky RacesWalter MelonWatership DownWayneheadThe Wayne ManifestoWe All Have TalesWe Wish You a Merry ChristmasWhat-a-MessWhat's New Mr. Magoo?What's With Andy?Where's Wally?: The Animated SeriesWhen I Grow UpWickedWidgetThe WigglesWil Cwac CwacThe Wild PuffalumpsThe Wild ThornberrysWild West C.O.W.-Boys of Moo MesaWildfireWilliam's Wish WellingtonsWilly Fog 2The Wind in the WillowsWinnersWisdom of the GnomesWishboneThe Wish That Changed ChristmasThe Wizard of OzWizards of Waverly PlaceWizbitThe WomblesWonderstruckWoof!Words and PicturesThe World of David the GnomeThe World of Peter Rabbit and FriendsThe Worst WitchWorzel GummidgeWorzel Gummidge Down UnderThe WotWotsThe Wubbulous World of Dr. SeussThe WuzzlesXyber 9: New DawnX-MenX-Men: EvolutionThe X'sYakkity YakYes, Virginia, there is a Santa ClausYolanda, the Black Corsair's DaughterYogi BearYoung DraculaYoho AhoyYoung Sherlock: The Mystery of the Manor HouseThe Zack FilesThe Zeta ProjectZiggy's GiftZoe KezakoZoey 101Zoo FamilyZoom the White DolphinZoom''

Sport
Olympic Games
FIFA World Cup
UEFA European Football Championship
FIFA Confederations Cup
UEFA Champions League
Six Nations Championship
League of Ireland Premier Division

References

+
Network 2